Ramiro Ponce Monroy (1925–2010) was Guatemalan vice presidential candidate of Ángel Aníbal Guevara in the 1982 presidential elections. He did not take office due to the military coup of Efraín Ríos Montt. He was the mayor of the Guatemala city from 1966 to 1970.

References

Guatemalan politicians
1925 births
2010 deaths
Leaders ousted by a coup
Mayors of places in Guatemala